One Thousand Wings is the debut studio album by the progressive pop group White Moth Black Butterfly.  It was released independently on November 11, 2013.

Track listing
Reluctance (3:04)
Equinox (4:17)
Ties of Grace (4:06)
The World Won't Sleep (5:36)
Rose (5:08)
Midnight Rivers (3:30)
Tired Eyes (4:23)
Certainty (4:04)
Omen (4:44)
Faith (4:12)
Paradise (4:00)

References 

2013 debut albums
White Moth Black Butterfly albums